Heckel’s Orontes barbel or Levantine barbel (Luciobarbus pectoralis) is a species of ray-finned fish in the genus Luciobarbus from the Orontes River basin (including Asi Nehri) in the Near East.

References 

 

Luciobarbus
Cyprinid fish of Asia
Fish of Iran
Fish of Syria
Fish of Turkey
Fish described in 1843
Taxa named by Johann Jakob Heckel